The International Refugee Assistance Project (IRAP)  works to organize law students and lawyers to develop and enforce legal and human rights for refugees and displaced persons. It was originally a project of the Urban Justice Center in New York City, founded and directed by Becca Heller. On December 23, 2018, IRAP became an independent 501(c)(3) organization.

IRAP has offices in New York City, Jordan, and Lebanon. IRAP is a plaintiff in International Refugee Assistance Project v. Trump and co-counsel in Darweesh v. Trump.

References

External links

Immigration political advocacy groups in the United States
Non-profit organizations based in New York (state)
Refugee aid organizations in the United States
Organizations with year of establishment missing
501(c)(3) organizations